Daniel Mikołajewski (born 25 August 1999) is a Polish professional footballer who plays as a defender for Podbeskidzie Bielsko-Biała.

Club career
Mikołajewski's footballing career started with Podbeskidzie at the age of 16. Despite being one of the youngest in the Podbeskidzie squad, he was often in the starting eleven with the team being in the I liga. In 2017, 6 months into his professional career, Mikołajewski moved to Ekstraklasa team Lechia Gdańsk in January. When he first joined Lechia Mikołajewski started training with the Lechia Gdańsk II team, and joined GKS Tychy for the remainder of the season. After his loan at Tychy, Mikołajewski joined Stomil Olsztyn on a season long loan. After two loan spells away from Lechia, Mikołajewski started training with the first team in 2018.

Honours
Raków Częstochowa
Polish Cup: 2020–21

References

1999 births
Sportspeople from Bielsko-Biała
Living people
Polish footballers
Poland youth international footballers
Association football defenders
Podbeskidzie Bielsko-Biała players
Lechia Gdańsk players
Lechia Gdańsk II players
GKS Tychy players
OKS Stomil Olsztyn players
Raków Częstochowa players
Ekstraklasa players
I liga players
III liga players
IV liga players